An ISAF Open Match Racing World Champion has been named annually since 1988. Since 2006 the World Match Racing Tour Champion has been named ISAF Match Racing World Champion.

Editions

For 2006 onwards, see World Match Racing Tour#World Champions.

References

World Sailing
Open match racing
Match racing competitions